Kanorado is a city in Sherman County, Kansas, United States.  The name is a portmanteau of Kansas and Colorado, because it is near the stateline.  As of the 2020 census, the population of the city was 153.

History
The first post office in the community was established in 1889, but the post office was called Lamborn until 1903.

On February 10, 2016 the House of Representatives of the State of Kansas passed a Resolution (Res.#6033) designating the City of Kanorado as the Top City of Kansas.  This is due to it being the highest city elevation in the State of Kansas at 3,907 feet.

Geography
Kanorado is located at  (39.3330542, -102.0379596). It is Exit 1 off of Interstate 70 in Kansas. Kanorado is located in Sherman County.

In 1873 Cutler's History of the State of Kansas book, it characterized the county as "very level land and almost treeless. Beaver Creek, Little Beaver and both forks of the Sappa River, rise in this county, and the North Fork of the Smoky Hill, passes from Colorado into the south part of the county, and out of it into Wallace." In the main, farming is by irrigation.

Demographics

2010 census
As of the census of 2010, there were 153 people, 73 households, and 44 families residing in the city. The racial makeup of the city was 78.4% White, 1.3% African American, 19.6% from other races, and 0.7% from two or more races. Hispanic or Latino of any race were 37.9% of the population.

There were 73 households, of which 23.3% had children under the age of 18 living with them, 54.8% were married couples living together, 2.7% had a female householder with no husband present, 2.7% had a male householder with no wife present, and 39.7% were non-families. 35.6% of all households were made up of individuals, and 17.8% had someone living alone who was 65 years of age or older. The average household size was 2.10 and the average family size was 2.68.

The median age in the city was 50.3 years. 20.3% of residents were under the age of 18; 5.1% were between the ages of 18 and 24; 17.7% were from 25 to 44; 39.9% were from 45 to 64; and 17.0% were 65 years of age or older. The gender makeup of the city was 44.4% male and 55.6% female.

2000 census
As of the census of 2000, there were 248 people, 91 households, and 62 families residing in the city. The racial makeup of the city was 86.69% White, 1.61% Native American, 10.89% from other races, and 0.81% from two or more races. Hispanic or Latino of any race were 25.40% of the population.

There were 91 households, out of which 35.2% had children under the age of 18 living with them, 59.3% were married couples living together, 4.4% had a female householder with no husband present, and 30.8% were non-families. 26.4% of all households were made up of individuals, and 13.2% had someone living alone who was 65 years of age or older. The average household size was 2.73 and the average family size was 3.29.

In the city, the population was spread out, with 30.6% under the age of 18, 8.1% from 18 to 24, 26.6% from 25 to 44, 23.4% from 45 to 64, and 11.3% who were 65 years of age or older. The median age was 37 years. For every 100 females, there were 115.7 males. For every 100 females age 18 and over, there were 107.2 males.

The median income for a household in the city was $24,265, and the median income for a family was $24,250. Males had a median income of $20,750 versus $20,625 for females. The per capita income for the city was $8,616. About 36.8% of families and 47.5% of the population were below the poverty line, including 78.4% of those under the age of eighteen and 20.8% of those 65 or over.

Education
Kanorado is served by Goodland USD 352 public school district.

Kanorado schools were closed through school unification. The Kanorado High School mascot was Kanorado Bears.

Infrastructure

Transportation

Rail
The Kyle Railroad passes along the south edge of the city.

Highways
 and  U.S. Route 24 pass east to west a few blocks south of the city. Old  U.S. Route 24 passes along the south edge of the city and follows roughly parallel to the railway.  Kansas Highway 267, a spur route, connects the city to I-70.

See also
 List of geographic portmanteaus
 List of Grand Army of the Republic Posts in Kansas
 List of highest United States cities by state or territory

References

Further reading

External links

 City of Kanorado
 Kanorado - Directory of Public Officials
 Photos of Kanorado
 Kanorado city map, KDOT

Cities in Kansas
Cities in Sherman County, Kansas